KKXX (930 AM) is a radio station broadcasting a Christian radio format. Licensed to Paradise, California, United States, the station serves the Chico area. The station is currently owned by Butte Broadcasting Company, Inc. and features programming from Salem Communications.

History

KKXX first broadcast as KMET in 1960. It was owned by Komet Radio, Inc.

On October 15, 1962, the call letters were changed to KNGL, or "K-Angel". The slogan was "The Voice From Paradise."

On January 6, 1967, the call letters were changed to KEWQ, as "Q-Radio, Family-Oriented Christian Radio", under Butte Broadcasting, Inc., which had acquired the station in December 1966.

In 1988 it began broadcasting under the name KKXX.

On November 7, 2009, an FM translator K283AR, at 104.5 FM (formerly of KYIX-FM), was acquired as a translator of KKXX.

On May 31, 2016, an additional FM translator K280GL, at 103.9 FM (formerly licensed to Lovelock, Nevada), was acquired as a second FM translator of KKXX.

On-air personalities
 Dave Ramsey - The Dave Ramsey Show
 Jerry Olenyn - (formerly of KRCR-TV)

References

External links
FCC History Cards for KKXX
KKXX official website
 
 
 

KXX
1960 establishments in California
Paradise, California
Radio stations established in 1960